The 1990 Team Ice Racing World Championship was the 12th edition of the Team World Championship. The final was held on ?, 1990, in Alma-Ata in Kazakhstan in the Soviet Union. The Soviet Union won their tenth title.

Final Classification

Qualifying 
Inzell - 27/28 Jan

See also 
 1990 Individual Ice Speedway World Championship
 1990 Speedway World Team Cup in classic speedway
 1990 Individual Speedway World Championship in classic speedway

References 

Ice speedway competitions
World